Super Smash Bros. is a crossover fighting game series published by Nintendo. The series was created by Masahiro Sakurai, who has directed every game in the series. The series is known for its unique gameplay objective which differs from that of traditional fighters, in that the aim is to increase damage counters and knock opponents off the stage instead of depleting life bars.

The original Super Smash Bros. was released in 1999 for the Nintendo 64. The series achieved even greater success with the release of Super Smash Bros. Melee, which was released in 2001 for the GameCube and became the best selling game on that system. A third installment, Super Smash Bros. Brawl, was released in 2008 for the Wii. Although HAL Laboratory had been the developer for the first two games, the third game was developed through the collaboration of several companies. The fourth installment, Super Smash Bros. for Nintendo 3DS and Wii U, was released in 2014 for the Nintendo 3DS and Wii U, respectively. The 3DS installment was the first for a handheld platform. A fifth installment, Super Smash Bros. Ultimate, was released in 2018 for the Nintendo Switch.

The series primarily features characters from various Nintendo franchises, including Super Mario, Donkey Kong, The Legend of Zelda, Metroid, Yoshi, Kirby, Star Fox, and Pokémon, as well as third-party franchises like Sonic the Hedgehog, Street Fighter, and Final Fantasy. The original Super Smash Bros. had only 12 playable characters, with the roster count rising for each successive game and later including third-party characters, with Ultimate containing every character playable in the previous games. In Melee, Brawl, and Ultimate, some characters are able to transform into different forms that have different styles of play and sets of moves. Every game in the series has been well received by critics, with much praise given to their multiplayer features, spawning a large competitive community that has been featured in several gaming tournaments.

Gameplay

Gameplay in the Super Smash Bros. series differs from many fighting games. Instead of winning by depleting an opponent's life bar, players seek to launch their opponents off the stage and out of bounds. Characters have a damage total which rises as they take damage, represented by a percentage value that measures up to 999%. As a character's percentage rises, they suffer stronger knockback from enemy attacks. To knock out an opponent, the player must knock that character outside the stage's boundaries in any direction. When a character is launched off the stage, the character can attempt to "recover" by using jumping moves and abilities to return to the stage. Some characters have an easier time recovering onto the stage than others due to their moves and abilities. Additionally, some characters vary in weight, with lighter characters being easier to launch than heavy characters.

Controls are greatly simplified in comparison to other fighting games, with one button used for standard attacks and another used for special attacks. Players can perform different types of moves by holding the directional controls up, down, to the side, or in a neutral position while pressing the attack or special button. As such, each character has four types of ground attacks, mid-air attacks, and special attacks that can be performed. Quickly pressing or tapping a directional input and the attack button together while on the ground allows players to perform a chargeable "Smash Attack", which is generally more powerful than other attacks. When characters are hit by attacks, they receive a hitstun that temporarily disallows any attacks to be made. This allows combos to be performed. A shield button allows players to put up a defensive shield which weakens with repeated use and will leave the player unable to move if broken. Combining the shield button with directional inputs and attack buttons allows the player to also perform dodges, rolls, grabs, and throws. The three basic actions in Super Smash Bros., attacking, grabbing, and shielding, are often described using a rock–paper–scissors analogy: attacking beats grabbing, grabbing beats shielding, and shielding beats attacking. When a player knocks another player off of the main platform, they may perform an action called edge-guarding. At the same time the player that has been knocked off will try to recover by jumping back onto the stage and avoiding the other players' edge-guarding.

Another element in the Super Smash Bros. series is battle items, the abundance of which players can adjust before matches. There are conventional "battering items", with which a player may hit an opponent, such as a home-run bat or a beam sword; throwing items, including Bob-ombs and Koopa shells; and shooting items, either single-shot guns or rapid-fire blasters. Recovery items allow the user to reduce their damage percentage by varying amounts. Poké Balls are special items that release a random Pokémon onto the battlefield to temporarily assist the user. Brawl introduced the Assist Trophy item which serves a similar purpose; instead of releasing Pokémon, it summons a character from another series. Brawl also introduces the Smash Ball, which when broken allows the fighter to perform a character-specific super attack known as a "Final Smash".

The rules that can be used in a match vary depending on the game, but the two most commonly used settings across all games are Time and Stock. Time mode uses a point-based system in which fighters earn points for knocking out their opponents and lose points for being knocked out or self-destructing (i.e. falling out of the stage by themselves). The player with the highest score at the end of the set time limit wins the match. Stock mode, also known as Survival, uses a life-based system in which players are given a set number of lives, known as stock, with each fighter losing a life whenever they are knocked out, becoming eliminated if they run out of lives. The winner is the last fighter standing once all other fighters are eliminated or, if a time limit is applied to the match, the fighter with the most lives remaining once time runs out. In the event of a tie, a Sudden Death match takes place. Here, each of the tied fighters are given a starting damage percentage of 300%, making them easier to launch off the stage, and the last fighter standing will be declared as the winner. In some games this process is repeated if the match ends in another tie.

Gameplay using competitive Super Smash Bros. rules is usually played in Stock mode with a timer. Items are turned off, and the only tournament-legal stages are those that do not feature hazards and other disruptive elements.

Characters 

Each game in the series has a number of playable characters (referred in the games as "fighters") taken from various gaming franchises, with over 80 in total across the series. Starting with Super Smash Bros. Brawl, characters from non-Nintendo franchises began to make playable appearances. In Super Smash Bros. for Nintendo 3DS and Wii U, players were able to customize existing fighters with altered movesets and abilities, as well as making their own Mii fighters that can be given three different fighting styles. There are also other non-playable characters that take the form of enemies, bosses, and summonable power-up items.

Music
Super Smash Bros. features music from some of Nintendo's popular gaming franchises. While many are newly arranged for the game, some songs are taken directly from their sources. The music for the Nintendo 64 game was composed by Hirokazu Ando, who later returned as sound and music director in Melee. Melee also features tracks composed by Tadashi Ikegami, Shougo Sakai, and Takuto Kitsuta. Brawl featured the collaboration of 38 contracted composers, including Final Fantasy series composer Nobuo Uematsu, who composed the main theme. Like in Brawl, Super Smash Bros. for Nintendo 3DS and Wii U featured many original and re-arranged tracks from various different gaming franchises from a variety of different composers and arrangers. Both versions have multiple musical tracks that can be selected and listened to using the returning "My Music" feature, including pieces taken directly from earlier Super Smash Bros. games. The 3DS and Switch games allow players to listen to their music from the sound menu while the system is in sleep/handheld mode. Ultimate continued the trend of multiple composers and arrangers working on remixed tracks, having over 800 in total.

Three soundtrack albums for the series have been released. An album with the original music for Super Smash Bros. was released in Japan by Teichiku Records in 2000. In 2003, Nintendo released Smashing...Live!, a live orchestrated performance of various pieces featured in Melee by the New Japan Philharmonic. A two-disc promotional soundtrack titled A Smashing Soundtrack was available for Club Nintendo members who registered both the 3DS and Wii U games between November 21, 2014, and January 13, 2015.

Development

1998–1999: Super Smash Bros. 
Super Smash Bros. was developed by HAL Laboratory, an independent affiliate company, during 1998. It began as a prototype created by Masahiro Sakurai and Satoru Iwata in their spare time, Dragon King: The Fighting Game, and featured no Nintendo characters. However, Sakurai hit on the idea of including fighters from different Nintendo franchises in order to provide "atmosphere" which he felt was necessary for a home console fighting game, and his idea was approved. Although never acknowledged by Nintendo or any developers behind Super Smash Bros., third-party sources have identified Namco's 1995 fighting game The Outfoxies as a possible inspiration. The game had a small budget and little promotion, and was originally a Japan-only release, but its huge success saw the game released worldwide. On October 20, 2022, Sakurai, who still had the prototype of Dragon King: The Fighting Game, demonstrated its gameplay, and its differences from the final product of Super Smash Bros.

Super Smash Bros. was introduced in 1999 for the Nintendo 64. It was released worldwide after selling over a million copies in Japan. It featured eight characters from the start (Mario, Donkey Kong, Link, Samus, Yoshi, Kirby, Fox, and Pikachu), with four unlockable characters (Luigi, Captain Falcon, Ness, and Jigglypuff), all of them created by Nintendo or one of its second-party developers.

In Super Smash Bros., up to four players can play in multiplayer (Versus) mode, with the specific rules of each match being predetermined by the players. There are two match types that can be chosen: Time, where the person with the most KOs at the end of the set time wins; and stock, where each player has a set number of lives and are eliminated from play when their lives are depleted.

This game's primary single-player mode, named "Classic Mode" in later series entries, features a series of predetermined opponents the player must defeat. Other single-player modes exist such as Training and several minigames, including "Break the Targets" and "Board the Platforms". All of these were included in the sequel, with the exception of "Board the Platforms".

There are nine playable stages in Versus mode, eight based on each of the starting characters (such as Princess Peach's Castle for Mario, Zebes for Samus, and Sector Z for Fox) and the unlockable Mushroom Kingdom, based around motifs from the original Super Mario Bros., even containing original sprites and the original version of the Overworld theme from that game.

2000–2004: Super Smash Bros. Melee 

A followup for the GameCube, Super Smash Bros. Melee, released in Japan and North America in late 2001, and in Europe and Australia in May 2002. It had a larger budget and development team than Super Smash Bros. did and was released to much greater praise and acclaim among critics and consumers. Since its release, Super Smash Bros. Melee has sold more than 7 million copies and was the best selling game on the GameCube. Super Smash Bros. Melee features 26 characters, of which 15 are available initially, more than doubling the number of characters in its predecessor. There are also 29 stages.

It introduced two new single-player modes alongside the Classic mode: Adventure mode and All-Star mode. Adventure mode has platforming segments similar to the original's "Race to the Finish" mini-game, and All-Star is a fight against every playable character in the game, allows the player only one life in which damage is accumulated over each battle and a limited number of healing items in between battles. Also in Melee is the Home-Run Contest minigame, which replaced Board the Platforms in the original game. Here, fighters will have to send Sandbag out of the stage to get the best distance with a baseball bat while damaging it for ten seconds.

There are also significantly more multiplayer modes and a tournament mode allowing for 64 different competitors whom can all be controlled by human players, although only up to four players can participate at the same time. Additionally, the game featured alternative battle modes, called "Special Melee", which allows players to make many different alterations to the battle, along with alternative ways to judge a victory, such as through collecting coins throughout the match.

In place of Super Smash Bros. character profiles, Melee introduced trophies (called "figures" in the Japanese version). The 293 trophies include three different profiles for each playable character, one unlocked in each single-player mode. In addition, unlike its predecessor, Melee contains profiles for many Nintendo characters who are either non-playable or do not appear in the game, as well as Nintendo items, stages, enemies, and elements.

HAL Laboratory developed Super Smash Bros. Melee, with Masahiro Sakurai as the head of production. The game was one of the first games released on the GameCube and highlighted the advancement in graphics from the Nintendo 64. The developers wanted to pay homage to the debut of the GameCube by making an opening full motion video sequence that would attract people's attention to the graphics. HAL worked with three separate graphic houses in Tokyo to make the opening sequence. On their official website, the developers posted screenshots and information highlighting and explaining the attention to physics and detail in the game, with references to changes from its predecessor. The Super Smash Bros. logo, consisting of two lines of different weight crossing within a circle, represented the idea of a franchise crossover, according to Sakurai, naturally dividing the circle into four sections to represent the four-player fighting mode.

2005–2010: Super Smash Bros. Brawl 

At a pre-E3 2005 press conference, president of Nintendo at the time Satoru Iwata announced the next installment of Super Smash Bros. was not only already in development for their next gaming console, but hoped it would be a launch game with Wi–Fi compatibility for online play. The announcement was unexpected to the creator of the Super Smash Bros. series, Masahiro Sakurai. Back in 2003, he had left HAL Laboratory, the company that was in charge with the franchises' development and was never informed of this announcement despite the fact shortly after resigning from the company, Iwata said if a new game was to be made, he would be in charge. It was not until after the conference Sakurai was called to Satoru Iwata's room on the top floor of a Los Angeles hotel, where he was told by Iwata "We'd like you to be involved in the production of the new Smash Bros., if possible near the level of director". Although Iwata had said he was hoping for it to be a launch game, Sakurai stated: "I decided to become director. And as of May 2005, I was the only member of the new Smash Bros. development team." Development of the game never actually started until October 2005, when Nintendo opened a new office in Tokyo just for its production. Nintendo also enlisted outside help from various developer studios, mainly Game Arts. Sakurai also stated that these people had spent excessive amounts of time playing Super Smash Bros. Melee. This team was given access to all the original material and tools from the development of Melee, courtesy of HAL Laboratory. Also, several Smash Bros. staff members that reside around the area of the new office joined the project's development.

On the game's official Japanese website, the developers explain reasons for making particular characters playable and explain why some characters were not available as playable characters upon release. Initially, the development team wanted to replace Ness with Lucas, the main character of Mother 3 for the Game Boy Advance, but they retained Ness in consideration of delays. The game's creators have included Lucas in the game's sequel, Super Smash Bros. Brawl. Video game developer Hideo Kojima originally requested Solid Snake, the protagonist of the Metal Gear series, to be a playable character in Super Smash Bros. Melee, but the game was too far in development for him to be included. As with Lucas, development time allowed for his inclusion in Brawl. Roy and Marth were initially intended to be playable exclusively in the Japanese version of Super Smash Bros. Melee. However, they received favorable attention during the game's North American localization, leading to the decision for the developers to include them in the Western version. Comparisons have been formed by the developers between characters which have very similar moves to each other on the website. Such characters were referred to as "clones" in the media.

At the Nintendo Media Conference at E3 2007, it was announced by Nintendo of America president Reggie Fils-Aimé that Super Smash Bros. Brawl would be released on December 3, 2007, in the Americas. However, just 2 months before its anticipated December release, the development team asked for more time to work on the game. During the Nintendo Conference on October 10, 2007, Nintendo Co., Ltd. president Iwata announced the delay.

On October 11, 2007, George Harrison of Nintendo of America announced that Super Smash Bros. Brawl would be released on February 10, 2008, in North America. On January 15, 2008, the game's release was pushed back one week in Japan to January 31 and nearly a month in the Americas to March 9. On April 24, 2008, it was confirmed by Nintendo of Europe that Brawl will be released in Europe on June 27.

Although a third Super Smash Bros. game had been announced long before E3 2006, Nintendo unveiled its first information in the form of a trailer in 2006, and the game was named Super Smash Bros. Brawl and released worldwide in 2008. The game featured a set of third-party characters, Solid Snake of Konami's Metal Gear series, and longtime Mario rival Sonic the Hedgehog from Sega's series of the same name. Brawl was also the first game in the franchise to support online play, via the Nintendo Wi-Fi Connection, and to offer the ability for players to construct their own original stages. The game features a total of 39 playable characters and 41 stages.

Brawl also features compatibility with four kinds of controllers (the Wii Remote on its side, the Wii Remote and Nunchuk combination, the Classic Controller, and the GameCube controller), while its predecessors only used the one controller designed for that system. The player also has the ability to change the configuration of controls and the controller type.

Super Smash Bros. Brawl features a single-player mode known as The Subspace Emissary. This mode features unique character storylines along with numerous side-scrolling levels and multiple bosses to fight, as well as CG cut scenes explaining the storyline. The Subspace Emissary features a new group of antagonists called the Subspace Army, who are led by the Ancient Minister. Some of these enemy characters appeared in previous Nintendo video games, such as Petey Piranha from the Super Mario series and a squadron of R.O.B.s based on classic Nintendo hardware. The Subspace Emissary also boasts a number of original enemies, such as the Roader, a robotic unicycle; the Bytan, a one-eyed ball-like creature which can replicate itself if left alone; and the Primid, enemies that come in many variations. Though primarily a single-player mode, The Subspace Emissary allows for cooperative multiplayer. There are five difficulty levels for each stage, and there is a method of increasing characters' powers during the game. This is done by placing collected stickers onto the bottom of a character's trophy between stages to improve various aspects of a fighter.

2011–2014: Super Smash Bros. for Nintendo 3DS and Wii U 

Director Masahiro Sakurai first announced that a new Super Smash Bros. game was planned for Nintendo 3DS and Wii U at E3 2011 in June 2011, but development only officially began following the completion of Sakurai's other project, Kid Icarus: Uprising, in March 2012. The game was later revealed to be a joint-project between Sora Ltd. and Bandai Namco Games, with various staff members from Bandai Namco's Soulcalibur and Tekken series assisting Sakurai in development. Sakurai, who was previously the sole person responsible for balance in the series' multiple fighters, has involved more staff to further improve the game's competitive balance. The game was officially revealed at E3 2013 on June 11, 2013, during a Nintendo Direct presentation. Along with screenshots being posted each weekday on the game's official website and Miiverse community, various cinematic trailers were released, introducing each of the brand new fighters. Sakurai chose to use these trailers, which benefit from Internet sharing, as opposed to including a story campaign similar to the Subspace Emissary mode featured in Brawl, as he believed the impact of seeing the mode's cinematic cutscenes for the first time was ruined by people uploading said scenes to video sharing websites.

At E3 2013, Sakurai stated that the tripping mechanic introduced in Brawl was removed, with him also stating that the gameplay was between the fast-paced and competitive style of Melee and the slower and more casual style of Brawl. While the games didn't feature cross-platform play between the Wii U and 3DS, due to each version featuring certain exclusive stages and gamemodes, there is an option to transfer customized characters and items between the two versions. The game builds upon the previous game's third-party involvement with the addition of third-party characters such as Capcom's Mega Man and Bandai Namco's Pac-Man, as well as the return of Sega's Sonic the Hedgehog. This involvement expands beyond playable characters, as other third-party characters, such as Ubisoft's Rayman, are also included in the game as trophies. The addition of Mii characters was made in response to the growing number of requests from fans to have their dream characters included in the game. To prevent potential bullying, as well as to maintain game balance online, Mii Fighters cannot be used in online matches against strangers. The decision to release the Wii U version at a later date from the 3DS version was made to allow each version to receive a dedicated debugging period. Hardware limitations on the Nintendo 3DS led to various design choices, such as the removal of mid-match transformations, the absence of the Ice Climbers, and the lack of Circle Pad Pro support.

At E3 2011, it was confirmed that a fourth Super Smash Bros. game would be coming to the Nintendo 3DS and Wii U, with the two games being cross-compatible with each other. Sakurai stated that the announcement was made public in order to attract developers needed for the games, as development for the games did not start until May 2012 due to production on Kid Icarus: Uprising. On June 21, 2012, Nintendo announced that the creation of the games would be a co-production between Sakurai's Sora Ltd. and Bandai Namco Entertainment. The games were officially revealed at E3 2013, with new information being released via trailers, Nintendo Direct presentations, and developer posts on Miiverse. The game features 58 characters, 19 of whom are new, and 7 of whom are downloadable. The game was released for Nintendo 3DS in Japan in September 2014, and in North America, Europe, and Australia the following month. The Wii U version was released in North America, Europe, and Australia in November 2014, and in Japan the following month.

2015–present: Super Smash Bros. Ultimate 

In April 2014, Bandai Namco Entertainment posted a recruitment advertisement on a Japanese career job opportunity website. The recruitment page consisted of a listing for programmers for "Smash Bros. 6", which was expected to be released in 2015 for both the Wii U and Nintendo 3DS. The page noted there were 120 game developers working on the project at the time, and that Bandai Namco expected that number to increase to 200. However, shortly after its publication, the page was taken down. In a January 2015 column in Weekly Famitsu, Sakurai alluded to the possibility of retirement, expressing doubt that he would be able to continue making games if his career continued to be as stressful as it was. In December 2015, Sakurai once again stated that he was not sure if there would be another game in the Smash Bros. series.

On March 8, 2018, a teaser for the game was shown during a Nintendo Direct. Sakurai later confirmed that he had worked on the game "in silence, day after day." On March 22, 2018, Nintendo announced that they would host another Super Smash Bros. Invitational tournament, in which a selected group of players would get to play the game for the first time and compete in a series of matches before a winner is chosen. The tournament took place alongside the Splatoon 2 World Championship at E3 2018 and was held on June 11–12. Both events were live streamed on Nintendo's official YouTube and Twitch channels. The title was confirmed as Super Smash Bros. Ultimate at E3 2018, where it was also announced that it would contain all playable characters from every previous game.

The game was released worldwide on December 7, 2018; according to the review aggregator platform Metacritic, it received "universal critical acclaim" from critics and scored 93 out of 100. In addition to all returning characters, the base game release adds 11 newcomers. Thirteen additional new characters are also available via downloadable content.

Like Brawl, Ultimate features a story mode, known as World of Light. The plot revolves around the destruction of the Smash Bros. world at the hands of original villain Galeem. Initially only able to play as Kirby, who survived the attack, the player travels across the wasteland to rescue the other playable fighters, gathering "Spirits" (the remnants of the world's non-playable characters who aid the player in battle) along the way.

Future 
In November 2021, Sakurai stated that the future of Super Smash Bros. is uncertain, and that there are no plans for a Super Smash Bros. Ultimate sequel.

Reception

Reviews for the Super Smash Bros. series are usually positive. The multiplayer mode in every game is usually highly praised; however, single-player modes have not always been viewed as highly.

Super Smash Bros. received praise for its multiplayer mode. Nintendo Power listed the series as being one of the greatest multiplayer experiences in Nintendo history, describing it as infinitely replayable due to its special moves and close-quarters combat. There were criticisms, however, such as the game's scoring being difficult to follow. In addition, the single-player mode was criticized for its perceived difficulty and lack of features.

Super Smash Bros. Melee generally received a positive reception from reviewers, most of whom credited Melee expansion of gameplay features from Super Smash Bros. Focusing on the additional features, GameSpy commented that "Melee really scores big in the 'we've added tons of great extra stuff' department." Reviewers compared the game favorably to Super Smash Bros.—IGN's Fran Mirabella III stated that it was "in an entirely different league than the N64 version"; GameSpot's Miguel Lopez praised the game for offering an advanced "classic-mode" compared to its predecessor, while detailing the Adventure Mode as "really a hit-or-miss experience." Despite a mixed response to the single-player modes, most reviewers expressed the game's multiplayer mode as a strong component of the game. In their review of the game, GameSpy stated that "you'll have a pretty hard time finding a more enjoyable multiplayer experience on any other console."

Brawl received a perfect score from the Japanese magazine Famitsu. The reviewers praised the variety and depth of the single-player content, the unpredictability of Final Smashes, and the dynamic fighting styles of the characters. Thunderbolt Games gave the game 10 out of 10, calling it "a vastly improved entry into the venerable series". Chris Slate of Nintendo Power also awarded Brawl a perfect score in its March 2008 issue, calling it "one of the very best games that Nintendo has ever produced". IGN critic Matt Casamassina, in his February 11 Wii-k in Review podcast, noted that although Brawl is a "solid fighter", it does have "some issues that need to be acknowledged", including "long loading times" and repetition in The Subspace Emissary.

Super Smash Bros. for 3DS and Super Smash Bros. for Wii U both garnered critical praise and were commercially successful, holding current ratings of 85/100 and 92/100 on Metacritic and 86.10% and 92.39% on GameRankings. Reviewers have particularly noted the large, diverse character roster, the improvements to game mechanics, and the variety of multiplayer options. Some criticisms in the 3DS version include a lack of single-player modes and issues concerning the 3DS hardware, such as the size of characters on the smaller screen when zoomed out and latency issues during both local and online multiplayer. There were also reports of players damaging their 3DS Circle Pads while playing the game excessively. The Wii U version's online play quality was mildly criticized for some inconsistency, but has overall been critically acclaimed. Daniel Dischoff of Game Revolution stated "It's true that Super Smash Bros. evolves every time with regard to new features, items, and characters to choose from. While your favorite character may not return or a few annoying pickups may force you to turn off items altogether, this represents the biggest leap forward Smashers have seen yet." Daniel Starky at GameSpot criticized the inconsistent online performance in the game, but still called it an "incredible game", noting "With the Wii U release, Smash Bros. has fully realized its goals." Jose Otero from IGN, praising the replayability of the game, states "Nearly every aspect of Smash Wii U seems fine-tuned not only to appeal to the nostalgia of long-time Nintendo fans, but also to be accessible to new players."

Sales
Super Smash Bros. sold 1.4 million copies in Japan, and 2.3 million in the U.S., with a total of 5.55 million units worldwide. Melee sold over 7 million units worldwide, becoming the best-selling GameCube game.
Brawl sold 1.524 million units in Japan , and sold 1.4 million units in its first week in the United States, becoming Nintendo of America's fastest selling game. The 3DS version sold over a million copies in its first weekend on sale in Japan, and has sold more than 9.63 million copies worldwide . Super Smash Bros. for Wii U became the fastest-selling Wii U game to date, selling 3.39 million units worldwide within just two months of availability, beating the record previously held by Mario Kart 8. As of September 2021, it has sold 5.38 million copies worldwide. Super Smash Bros. Ultimate on Nintendo Switch has set new record highs for the series and for the system. It sold an estimate of 5.6 million copies in global sales during its first week of launch, beating out records previously held by games such as Pokémon: Let's Go, Pikachu! and Let's Go, Eevee!, Super Mario Odyssey, and The Legend of Zelda: Breath of the Wild. In Japan, Ultimate outsold the records held by Super Smash Bros. for Nintendo 3DS with 2.6 million copies sold in five weeks. It is also the third best-selling game for the Nintendo Switch and the best-selling fighting game of all time, with 28.82 million copies sold worldwide as of June 30, 2022.

Legacy

Esports 

The Super Smash Bros. series has been widely played as a competitive video game, with several of the games in the series having been featured in high-profile tournaments, including Major League Gaming (MLG) and Evolution Championship Series (EVO), among others. The first publicized professional Smash Bros. tournaments were held for Super Smash Bros. Melee in early 2002. Current major Smash Bros. annual tournament series include GENESIS, EVO, Super Smash Con and The Big House. The competitive Smash Bros. community is well known among the wider fighting game community for its decentralized, grassroots scene, a byproduct of Nintendo's historical reluctance to directly promote the scene.

Notes

References

External links
 
 

 
Video game franchises
Nintendo franchises
Cooperative video games
Crossover video games
Action video games
Fighting games
2.5D fighting games
Platform games
Platform fighters
Video game franchises introduced in 1999
Video games about parallel universes